Peter Quinn (3 December 1892 – 1976) was an English footballer. He made over 150 Football League appearances for Blackpool in the early 20th century. He also played for Preston North End and Bury, amongst other clubs.

References

1892 births
1976 deaths
Footballers from Sunderland
English footballers
Association football midfielders
Worcester City F.C. players
Spennymoor United F.C. players
Blackpool F.C. players
Preston North End F.C. players
Fleetwood Town F.C. players
Bury F.C. players
New Brighton A.F.C. players
FA Cup Final players